Mullahoran ( – Hilltop of Odhrán) is a townland in southern County Cavan, bordering County Longford, Ireland. It is also the name of a Roman Catholic parish. It is a constituent part of the electoral division and civil parish of Drumlumman.

Built environment
Our Lady of Lourdes Roman Catholic Church (built 1910) is located in the area. The church was built in an unusual Romanesque style and was designed by Dublin architect Thomas McNamara.

Sport
Mullahoran GAA club and grounds (Our Lady of Lourdes Park) are located in the area; the club takes its members from the surrounding rural community.

Notable people
Paul Brady (handballer)
Sean McGuire - fiddler
John Wilson (Irish politician)

See also
Kilcogy
Mullinalaghta

References

Townlands of County Cavan